The 560s decade ran from January 1, 560, to December 31, 569.

Significant people

References